Kuntheria is a plant genus related to Schelhammera. It contains one species, Kuntheria pedunculata (F.Muell.) Conran & Clifford, endemic to Queensland, Australia.

References 

Colchicaceae
Colchicaceae genera
Monotypic Liliales genera
Flora of Queensland